Xiong Shuang (died 822 BC) was a Chinese nobleman who served as the 12th viscount of the state of Chu during the Western Zhou Dynasty of ancient China from 827 to 822 BC. Like other early Chu rulers, he held the hereditary noble rank of viscount first granted to his ancestor Xiong Yi by King Cheng of Zhou.

Xiong Shuang succeeded his father, the younger Xiong Yan, who died in 828 BC. Xiong Shuang had three younger brothers: Xiong Xue, Xiong Kan, and Xiong Xun.  When Xiong Shuang died in 822 BC, his brothers fought one another for the throne. The youngest brother Xiong Xun was ultimately victorious and ascended the throne, while Xiong Xue was killed and Xiong Kan escaped to Pu.

References

Monarchs of Chu (state)
9th-century BC Chinese monarchs
822 BC deaths
Year of birth unknown